Juma is a given name and surname which may refer to:

Juma (actor) (1943-1989), Zanzibar born child actor
Calestous Juma (1953-2017), Harvard professor of the Practice of International Development
Ibrahim Juma (footballer) (born 1992), Ugandan footballer
Jamal Jumá, Iraqi poet, resident in Denmark
Khaled Juma (born 1965), Palestinian poet, author of children's books, writer of song lyrics and plays
Musa Juma (1968–2011), Kenyan rumba and Benga musician
Omar Ali Juma (1941–2001), Chief Minister of Zanzibar
Rajab Ahmad Juma, Tanzanian politician
Riziki Omar Juma, Tanzanian politician
Shoka Khamis Juma, Tanzanian politician
Juma al-Dossary, Bahraini held in Guantanamo
Juma al Majid (born ca. 1930), UAE businessman
Juma Al-Maktoum (born 1984), Emirati sport shooter
Juma Butabika (died 1979), Ugandan military officer
Juma Darwish Al-Mashri (born 1984), Oman footballer
Juma Din (born ca. 1973), Afghan held in Guantanamo
Juma Ikangaa (born 1957) Tanznaian marathon runner
Juma Jabu (born 1988), Tanzanian footballer
Juma Jamaldin Akukweti (1947–2007), Tanzanian politician
Juma Kapuya (born 1945), Tanzanian politician
Juma Khan, Afghan alleged drug smuggler
Juma Khan Hamdard (born 1954), Afghan provincial governor
Juma Masudi (born 1977), Burundian footballer
Jum'a-Mohammad Mohammadi (died 2003), Afghan politician
Juma Mossi (born 1973), Burundian footballer
Juma Mwapachu (born 1942), Tanzanian politician
Juma Nature (born 1980), Tanzanian hip hop artist and a singer
Juma Ngasongwa (born 1941), Tanzanian politician
Juma Oris (1933?-2001), Ugandan rebel leader
Juma Saeed Worju, South Sudanese politician
Juma Santos (1948-2007), American percussionist 
Juma Sultan (born 1942), American percussionist

See also
Jumaa